The Faysal Bank One Day Cup (aka National One-day Championship) is the premier List A cricket domestic competition in Pakistan, which was held from 5 to 22 March 2013.

Venue

Fixtures and results
All times shown are in Pakistan Standard Time (UTC+05).

Group stage

Group A
Points Table Source:Cricinfo

Group B
Points Table Source:Cricinfo

Knockout stage

Semi-finals
1st Semi-Finals Match Report

2nd Semi-Finals

Final

Statistics

Most runs

Most wickets

External links
 Tournament site on ESPNcricinfo
 Tournament site on Cricket Archive
 Tournament site on PCB official website

2013 in Pakistani cricket
2013
Faysal Bank One Day Cup